Book Forum Lviv (formerly The Lviv Publishers’ Forum) is the biggest book fair in Ukraine. It has been held in Lviv each September since 1994 and is organized by the Publishers' Forum, an NGO founded after the success of the initial Lviv book forum.
It is the largest book fair in Ukraine and one of the largest events of its kind in Eastern Europe. It has also been called Lviv's most popular event. Main expositions are located in the Palace of Arts near the Potocki Palace.
The program of the Forum includes literary events and contests, presentations of publishing houses and authors, meetings with authors, literary readings, autograph sessions, discussions, round-table meetings, and performances. It participates in the organization of collective expositions at the international book fairs in Warsaw, Moscow, Frankfurt, Leipzig, Pisa, and Vilnius.

History  
1994 – The forum was established by Oleksandra Koval and held for the first time in September, with a book fair and a series of 25 professional and literary events.

1995 – The Publishers’ Forum Best Book Award was established.

1997 – The Literary Festival, a highly popular event among Ukrainian youth, separates from the Forum.

2001 – Foreign guests start to participate in the Literary Festival.

2002 – The “Best Young Reader of Ukraine” contest is established. Over the years around 500 thousand children from all over Ukraine have taken part in it.

2005 – The contest “The Best Young Reader of Ukraine” becomes nationwide.

2006 – An annual charity event, “Present a Child with a Book!”, is introduced.

2006 – The Literary Festival becomes international.

2007 – “The Best Young Reader of Ukraine” and the Festival “Bookmania” become a part of the book fair “Publishers’ Forum for Children”. This event, completely devoted to the children's literature and reading, is a unique event in Ukraine and one of a few of this kind in Central and Eastern Europe.

2007 – Within the Lviv Publishers’ Forum the publishers’ business forum, a program of professional events for book publishers, is established.

2007–2010 – The International Educational Forum “Education” takes place. It includes a specialized exhibition of educational technologies, educational and instructional materials and educational institutions and the International Colloquium “The European Dimension of Ukrainian Education” with the chiefs of the Ministry of Education and Science of Ukraine and scientists involved.

2008–2012 – Each year two weeks before the “Publishers’ Forum for Children” the “Readers’ Marathon”  is held during which Ukrainian writers visit schools in Lviv and run contests, readings, discussions, etc.

2010 – Within the Lviv Publishers’ Forum, a program of professional events for librarians, called “Biblioforum”, is held. Within the Lviv Publishers’ Forum, the TRANSLIT international translation festival is established.

2011 – Due to the extension of the format and geography of the festival, the “Publishers’ Forum for Children” changes its name to the Lviv International Children's Festival.

2011–2012 – The international project «ArtDrome: literature and more» within the program of cultural managers exchange “TANDEM: Ukraine – European Union – Moldova”.

2012 – NGO “Publishers’ Forum” organizes Ukraine's stand at the Leipzig Book Fair.

2012 – NGO “Publishers’ Forum” becomes the local partner of the project “Book Platform” in Ukraine.

2012 – Within the Lviv Publishers’ Forum, the festival of cultural management and literary criticism CONTEXT is established.

2013 – Within the Lviv Publishers’ Forum, the status “Country – Guest of Honor” is established and inaugurally granted to Poland.

2017 - Author Larysa Denysenko is forced to cancel her talk at the Forum as the event organizers felt they couldn't guarantee safety after receiving threats, including a letter from 15 radical far-right nationalist groups, based on the content of her children's book that included same-sex parents.

2020 -- Held online due to the COVID-19 pandemic.

References

Bibliography

External links
 Official web page of the Lviv Book Forum (Офіційна сторінка Форуму видавців)

Culture in Lviv
Recurring events established in 1994
1994 establishments in Ukraine